Agneekaal is a 1990 Indian Hindi-language political film, produced by Ranjit Herma under the Siddharth Pictures banner, directed by Abbas–Mustan. It stars Jeetendra, Raj Babbar, Madhavi,   Aasif Sheikh, Sonu Walia, Tinu Anand, Kiran Kumar, Sadashiv Amrapurkar in the pivotal roles with music composed by Pankaj Bhatt. It is the debut Hindi movie for director duo Abbas–Mustan. They had made Gujarathi movies previously. The movie has the famous song "Pankhida O Pankhida"

Plot 
Bharat Nagar is a city in modern secular India that is terrorized by a gangster named Bhika, who is protected by the local politician, Gulabchand Jhakotia, his son, police inspector Bhushan and the DSP Anand Saxena. When Inspector Gurdayal Singh accumulates enough evidence to arrest Bhika, he is killed. Bhushan then attempts to molest an activist, Bharati but is stopped by Vijay, her fiancé. Bhushan kills Vijay and ends up getting killed by Bharati. The police arrest Bharati and hold her in a cell without permitting her to meet with anyone including her brother, Aadesh. Bhushan's position is filled by SP Jagdishan, who attempts to bring law and order to this troubled city and even permits Aadesh to meet Bharati. When Bhika kills the owner of the local newspaper "Bharat Nagar Times", Jagdishan arrests him after D'Souza's daughter, Mary, comes forward to testify - only to get instructions for his transfer to distant Malegaon, and the immediate release of Bhika - who, together with Gulabchand, are now set to rule over Bharat Nagar - with no one bold enough to stand in their way.

It is loosely based on the prominent police officer Zanjeerwala Jhala (M.M.Jhala) from Gujarat who was quite famous for all over India for his heroism.

Cast
 Jeetendra as Vijay
 Raj Babbar as SP Jagdishan "Zanjeerwala"
 Madhavi as Bharati
 Aasif Sheikh as Aadesh
 Sonu Walia as Mary D'Souza
 Tinu Anand as Mr. D'Souza
 Kiran Kumar as DSP Anand Saxena 
 Sadashiv Amrapurkar as Gulabchand Jhakotia
 Joginder as Bhika
 Razzak Khan as Janta
 Amrit Patel as Constable Vasantrao Dhole

Soundtrack 
Lyrics: Shyam Raj

External links

1990 films
1990s Hindi-language films
Films directed by Abbas–Mustan
Films scored by Pankaj Bhatt